Mount Manunggal is the third-highest peak in the island of Cebu after Osmena Peak and Lugsangan Peak. It is the site of the crash of the presidential plane Mt. Pinatubo which killed President Ramon Magsaysay and twenty-four others on March 17, 1957. An annual trek is held here to commemorate his death. The site is accessible through many trails but the trail from Tagba-o and at Cantipla in Tabunan, Cebu City is the main route from which the yearly Pres. Ramon Magsaysay Death Anniversary Climb is held.

Geography

History
Mount Manunggal is within the Central Cebu Protected Landscape and is protected by Republic Act 9486, otherwise known as the “Central Cebu Protected Landscape Act”; which also covers the Mananga-Kotkot-Lusaran river system, the Sudlon National Park and the watersheds of Buhisan, Mananga and Lusaran.

Minerals
The trail to Mount Manunggal from the jump-off point at the river that separates Cebu City from Balamban is quite steep and could be achieved in about four (4) to seven (7) hours for first-timers, depending upon your physical conditioning, and about two (2) to three (3) hours to those who are now very familiar with its terrain. The trail to Mount Manunggal from Tagba-o is absent of forest canopies and wildlife and traverses through many upland farms planted with onions, tomatoes, ginger, garlic, eggplants, cabbage, carrots, etc. It is wide enough to let two persons pass by each other at its narrowest part and there are no prominent barriers which impede movement save for the lack of shady areas to rest from the penetrating heat of the sun.

Water resources abound within the foot of the mountain like rivers, springs and waterfalls. A cool spring near the campsite gives visitors relief from thirst and its water volume never lessens even in extreme drought and El Niño conditions.

Monument

At the campsite, the monument to President Magsaysay and the cylinder block of one of the Pinatubo's engines remind visitors of the historical value of Manunggal in Philippine history. A chapel, erected nearby during the height of a communist insurgency in the 1980s, guides the local inhabitants' spiritual yearning.

On April 24, 2012, the crash site was declared a National Historical Landmark by the National Historical Commission of the Philippines.

References

External links 
 
 The source of the article
 Video showing about Mount Manunggal

Mountains of the Philippines
Landforms of Cebu